Myron Dorn (born October 23, 1954 in Beatrice, Nebraska) is a state senator for Nebraska from District 30. He is from Adams in Gage County. He identifies as a Republican.

Electoral history

References

External links
 District 30 News and Information
 Biography

Republican Party Nebraska state senators
Living people
1954 births
People from Gage County, Nebraska
University of Nebraska–Lincoln alumni